Deh-e Fakhireh (also Romanized as Deh-e Fakhīreh; also known as Fakhīreh-ye Bālā and Fakhīreh-ye ‘Olyā) is a village in Margan Rural District, in the Central District of Hirmand County, Sistan and Baluchestan Province, Iran. At the 2006 census, its population was 112, in 24 families.

References 

Populated places in Hirmand County